The Scottish Rally Championship is a rallying series run throughout Scotland over the course of a year, that comprises seven gravel surface events.

The 2016 season begins in the snow-covered forest tracks around Inverness on 20 February, with the season finale taking place around Castle Douglas on 10 September. Driver Jock Armstrong and regular co-driver Paula Swinscoe will start the season as defending champions having won the 2015 Championship.

Aberdeen based haulage company ARR Craib will sponsor the series for the fourth year in a row.

Alongside the main championship, 2016 will see a number of initiatives run over the course of the year including the following:
 Scottish 2WD Rally Championship - Open to registered 2 Wheel drive cars
 SRC Juniors - Open to registered young drivers and co-drivers
 SRC Ladies - Open to registered female crews
 SRC Subaru cup - Open to registered Subaru cars
 SRC 205 Cup - Open to registered Peugeot 205 and Citroen C2 cars

2016 calendar
For season 2016 there is to be seven events held predominantly on gravel surfaces.

Calendar changes
On 24 May, the Jim Clark Reivers Forest Rally Rally management team announced via a press release that the 2016 event – usually round 4 of the championship and held in June, would not take place. Insufficient entries was cited as the reason.

2016 events podium

Notes

Drivers' championship standings

Points are awarded to the highest placed registered drivers on each event as follows: 30, 28, 27, 26, and so on down to 1 point. At the end of the season, competitors nominate their best 5 scores out of the 6 events as their final overall Championship score.

References

External links
 
 RSAC Scottish Rally Homepage

Scottish Rally Championship seasons
Scottish Rally Championship
Scottish Rally Championship